Horace Fuller may refer to:
 Horace H. Fuller, American soldier and general
 Horace Williams Fuller, American lawyer and editor